Carlos Barredo Llamazales (born 5 June 1981, in Oviedo, Asturias) is a Spanish former road racing cyclist, who competed as a professional between 2004 and 2012. He was issued a suspension for the first two months of the 2011 season in response to a fight with Rui Costa after a 2010 Tour de France stage, with Barredo claiming that Costa had ridden dangerously in the final stages of the race, but later apologising for his actions.

Doping
In December of that year, he told Spanish newspaper El Pais that he was retiring from cycling and that he was starting a new job in a café in Madrid. UCI gave him a two-year sanction as a result of abnormalities in his biological passport, and he was disqualified from 26 October 2007 to 24 September 2011.

Major results

 2004 - Liberty Seguros
 1st Stage 3 Vuelta a Asturias

 2005 - Liberty Seguros
  Three Days of De Panne
 3rd Grand Prix Pino Cerami
 7th Overall Eneco Tour

 2006 - Team Wurth
 1st Stage 3 Tour Down Under

 2007 - Quickstep-Innergetic
 5th Clásica de San Sebastián
 10th Overall Vuelta a España

 2008 - Quickstep-Innergetic
 5th GP Lugano
 8th Overall Paris–Nice
 1st Stage 5

 2009 - Quickstep-Innergetic
 1st Clásica de San Sebastián

 2010 - Quickstep-Innergetic
 1st Stage 15 Vuelta a España
 9th Giro di Lombardia

 2011 - Rabobank
 2nd Clásica de San Sebastián

2012 - Rabobank
 3rd Overall Tour of Belgium

References

External links
 Official Site 
 
 Carlos Barredo's profile on Cycling Base

1981 births
Doping cases in cycling
Living people
Sportspeople from Oviedo
Cyclists from Asturias
Spanish sportspeople in doping cases
Spanish male cyclists